The Philippine House Special Committee on Food Security is a special committee of the Philippine House of Representatives.

Jurisdiction 
As prescribed by House Rules, the committee's jurisdiction is on programs and policies relating to food production and distribution which includes the following:
 Availability and accessibility of these commodities to the people
 Factors affecting food supply in the country
 Long-term food security for the nation
 Other actions intended to achieve sustained growth and self-reliance in the production of basic food commodities

Members, 18th Congress

See also 
 House of Representatives of the Philippines
 List of Philippine House of Representatives committees

Notes

References

External links 
House of Representatives of the Philippines

Food Security